Ephysteris neosirota is a moth in the family Gelechiidae. It was described by Anthonie Johannes Theodorus Janse in 1950. It is found in Namibia.

References

Ephysteris
Moths described in 1950